The Cedar Range is a mountain range in Lincoln County, Nevada.

The Cedar Range is the adjacent range north of the Clover Mountains, anchoring the south on the east perimeter of the Meadow Valley Wash watershed.

References

See also 
 List of Great Basin Divide border landforms of Nevada

Mountain ranges of Lincoln County, Nevada
Mountain ranges of Nevada